The 1976–77 Indiana Hoosiers men's basketball team represented Indiana University. Their head coach was Bobby Knight, who was in his 6th year. The team played its home games in Assembly Hall in Bloomington, Indiana, and was a member of the Big Ten Conference.

Coming off an undefeated season (32–0), the Hoosiers faced a disappointing season by completing the regular season with an overall record of 16–11 and a conference record of 11–7, finishing 4th in the Big Ten Conference. After winning their third national title last season, Indiana did not participate in any postseason tournament.

Roster

Schedule/Results

|-
!colspan=8| Regular Season
|-

Notes

^Jan 27/Feb 15: Minnesota forfeited these games, thus IU's official record is 16–11 (11–7).

References

Indiana Hoosiers men's basketball seasons
Indiana
Indiana Hoosiers
Indiana Hoosiers